PINY: Institute of New York (also known as PINY: Pinypon Institute of New York) is an English-language Spanish animated television series that premiered on Disney Channel in Spain on 18 September 2016. The series is created by Victor M. Lopez and Rubén Zarauza, and is based on the Pinypon toy franchise.

The series is about Michelle Fairchild, a student at the titular prestigious college in a bid to become a top fashion designer. She befriends the Indie Girls; Lilith and Tasha, as the trio have adventures in PINY.

Plot
PINY: Institute of New York follows Michelle Fairchild, a humble 14-year-old designer who is interested in fashion and dreams of making it big in the "fashion world." One day she gets offered an interview from PINY for a fully funded position in their class. After making a rocky first impression on the headmistress, Madame Forbes, she still gets accepted in PINY. Once she gets there, she meets her roommates Tasha Robinson, a faithful self-confident singer, and Lilith Henderson, an elegant and charming scientist, who she eventually becomes friends with as they form the Indie Girls team. However, Michelle is also placed one room across from the room of Julia Cooper, the spoiled leader of the Beautiful People, and Dory and Rita, her loyal assistants. Julia plans on eliminating and humiliating Michelle and the Indie Girls.

Characters

Main Characters

Michelle - Appearance
 
Michelle has white skin, blue eyes and pink hair. She has two outfits like other characters.

Her first outfit - She has her hair down, and she has a blue sparkly headband on her head, with a blue flower with pink in the middle. She wears a blue shirt with long sleeves, and wears a dark purple skirt, and is also wearing blue boots with white on them.

Her second outfit- Her hair is more shorter, she is wearing the same blue headband, the same skirt and shoes. But, she is wearing a blue shirt with short sleeves, which has white near the top and the bottom.

Personality

She is a kind, impulsive, and creative 14-year old designer, and the new girl at PINY. She is a part of the Indie Girls team. Michelle is a girl of humble origins and possesses a great talent for design and fashion. She has always dreamed of being able to create her own brand of clothing and now she has become a PINY student, her dream could come true. Her creativity and perseverance will certainly be key to achieving her dreams.

She is quite friendly and speaks for her human rights. Let's say, Julia Cooper would not get in her way for being well. Michelle Fairchild has two roommates, Tasha and Lilith, who are also her best friends in the school. They hang out together and support each other.

Michelle points out where she has gone wrong. An example is shown in the episode Hire Me. Michelle was part of a TV show hosted by Annie Summers but she finally realized having the job was a big mistake as in Secret Non-Admirer she publishes a picture of Julia and did not own up to it because she was scared of losing her scholarship. Michelle also has a huge crush on Will.

Michelle is sweet and determined. She will stop at nothing when she has her mind set to get whatever she wants! She can be stubborn at times, though. For example, in episode 26, " Who is Michelle", she is mean to her best friends because the fact that she is adopted makes her not feel like herself anymore - she feels like nobody but at the end of the episode, she manages to apologize to her friends. However, she is a very sweet person in the long run. She is also quite clumsy, especially around Julia.

Tasha - Appearance

Tasha has moderate vermilion hair and luminous vivid amber eyes.

Like the rest of the female main characters, Tasha is usually seen wearing two different outfits in the series.

Her most common outfit would be a luminous vivid amber dress with black and luminous vivid amber striped skirt underneath a green and white jacket. She wears very pale amber leggings. On her feet is a pair of luminous vivid amber mid-heel boots with deep amber heels, quarter, and laces. Her hair would be styled into an afro with bangs. On her head, she would wear a vivid spring green and pale, light grayish spring green colors headband with a pale amber wing decoration at each ends.

Her second outfit would be a light brilliant amber jacket underneath a pale amber blouse. She wears a moderate sea green skirt with white stripes and a dark amber belt. On her feet would be a pair of brilliant amber mid-heel boots with dark amber heels, welt, and laces, white toe cap, and moderate spring green tongue. The boots have a green with black and luminous vivid amber in the inside star on each sides. Her hair would be styled into dreadlocks with bangs. On her head, she would also wears the same vivid spring green and pale, light grayish spring green colors headband but with the star decoration at each ends instead of wings.

Recurring
 Madame Rania Forbes is the strict headmistress of PINY.
 Sam Ryan is Will's best friend. He has a crush on Michelle.
 Stella Marie is a Western cowgirl who the Indie Girls befriend in the episode "Locked In".
 James Fairchild is Michelle's father. His wife died when Michelle was little.
 Mr. Grasso is the Professor at PINY.
 Austin Zimmer is Lilith's cousin and a famous singer.

Episodes

Broadcast
PINY: Institute of New York premiered on Disney Channel in Spain on 18 September 2016. The series also premiered on Pop in the United Kingdom and Ireland on 4 September 2017.

References

External links
 
  on Pop

2016 Spanish television series debuts
2017 Spanish television series endings
Spanish children's animated comedy television series
Anime-influenced Western animated television series
English-language television shows
Spanish children's animated action television series
Television shows set in New York City
Teen animated television series